Clinton Smith (born January 19, 1964) is an American former basketball player in the National Basketball Association (NBA). A forward born in Cleveland, Ohio, he went to college at Cleveland State University where he helped lead the 1985–86 team to the Sweet Sixteen. He was drafted in the fifth round by the Golden State Warriors in the 1986 NBA draft and he played two seasons in the NBA.

External links
http://www.basketball-reference.com/players/s/smithcl01.html

1964 births
Living people
Albany Patroons players
American expatriate basketball people in France
Basketball players from Cleveland
Charleston Gunners players
Cleveland State Vikings men's basketball players
Fort Wayne Fury players
Golden State Warriors draft picks
Golden State Warriors players
Junior college men's basketball players in the United States
La Crosse Catbirds players
Limoges CSP players
Rapid City Thrillers players
Small forwards
Washington Bullets players
American men's basketball players
John Adams High School (Ohio) alumni
American expatriate basketball people in the Philippines
Magnolia Hotshots players
Philippine Basketball Association imports